Clifford Scott may refer to:

Clifford Scott (musician) (1928–1993), American saxophonist and flautist
Clifford Scott (psychoanalyst) (1903–1997), Canadian psychoanalyst